Teixidó or Teixido is a Catalan occupational surname that means "weaver", a variant of Teixidor. Notable people with this surname include:

 Enrique Gimeno Teixidó (1929–2007), Spanish-Mexican composer and conductor
 Frédéric Teixido (b. 1972), French footballer
 Lionel Teixido (b. 1979), Spanish rugby league player
 Mercedes Teixido, American artist
 Nuria Quevedo Teixidó (b. 1938), Spanish painter and graphic artist

Catalan-language surnames